Tiger Varadachariar (1876–1950) was a Carnatic music vocalist from what is now the Indian state of Tamil Nadu. M. D. Ramanathan was his student.

Early life

Varadachariar was born on 1 August 1876 in Kolathur, Chingleput district.

Masilamani and Pedda Singaracharyulu encouraged him in his musical pursuits, and he studied under Patnam Subramania Ayyar for three years from the age of fourteen.  However, financial family constraints required the young Varadachariar to take a position with the Survey Department at Calicut. He continued to pursue his musical interests, however, and when living in Mysore, he attracted the attention of Krishnaraja Wodeyar, who honoured him with the title of 'Tiger' and presented him with a 'thoda'.

Tiger Varadachari had lived for many years in Kaveripatnam then Salem District (now Krishnagiri). His humble home is still available as unaltered in Periyar St, Kaveripatnam.

Many of Varadachariar's family members also pursued careers in music.  His father Ramanujachariar was a musical discourser, his brother K.V. Srinivasa Ayyangar was a musicologist, and another brother K.V. Krishnamachariar was a veena player. Varadachariar also noted that he learned much from the singing of his sister.

Music

Varadachariar composed 'Eediname Sudinamu' for C.Rajagopalachariar's visit to Kalkshetra in 1948 as Governor General.

'Nidu Charanamule' (Simhendramadyamam) under the signature of Tyagaraja is actually a composition of the 'Three musketeers of Kaladipet', the Tiger Brothers.

Awards

Varadachariar was awarded the Sangeetha Kalanidhi by Madras Music Academy in the year 1932.

References

1876 births
1950 deaths
Male Carnatic singers
Carnatic singers
Sangeetha Kalanidhi recipients
20th-century Indian male singers
20th-century Indian singers
19th-century Indian male singers
Singers from Tamil Nadu
Singers in British India